Year 1476 (MCDLXXVI) was a leap year starting on Monday (link will display the full calendar) of the Julian calendar.

Events 
 January–December 
 March 1 – Battle of Toro (War of the Castilian Succession): Although militarily inconclusive, this ensures the Catholic Monarchs the Crown of Castile, forming the basis for modern-day Spain.
 March 2 – Battle of Grandson (Burgundian Wars): Swiss forces defeat Burgundy.
 June 22 – Battle of Morat (Burgundian Wars): The Burgundians suffer a crushing defeat, at the hands of the Swiss.
 July 26 – Battle of Valea Albă (Moldavian–Ottoman Wars): The Ottoman Sultan Mehmed II defeats Stephen III of Moldavia.
 November 26 – Vlad the Impaler declares himself reigning Voivode (Prince) of Wallachia for the third and last time. He is killed on the march to Bucharest, probably before the end of December. His head is sent to his old enemy, Ottoman Sultan Mehmed II.

 Date unknown 
 Leonardo da Vinci is acquitted on charges of sodomy, after which he disappears from the historical record for two years. 
 Axayacatl, sixth Tlatoani of Tenochtitlán, is defeated by the Tarascans of Michoacán. 
 Goyghor Mosque is built by Musa ibn Haji Amir and his son, Majlis Alam.

Births 
 January 14 – Anne St Leger, Baroness de Ros, English baroness (d. 1526)
 March 12 – Anna Jagiellon, Duchess of Pomerania, Polish princess (d. 1503)
 May 2 – Charles I, Duke of Münsterberg-Oels, Count of Kladsko, Governor of Bohemia and Silesia (d. 1536)
 May 19 – Helena of Moscow, Grand Duchess consort of Lithuania and Queen consort of Poland (d. 1513)
 June 28 – Pope Paul IV (d. 1559)
 July 17 – Adrian Fortescue, English Roman Catholic martyr (d. 1539)
 July 21
 Alfonso I d'Este, Duke of Ferrara (d. 1534)
 Anna Sforza, Italian noble (d. 1497)
 July 22 – Zhu Youyuan, Ming Dynasty politician (d. 1519)
 August 28 – Kanō Motonobu, Japanese painter (d. 1559)
 September 11 – Louise of Savoy, French regent (d. 1531)
 October 1 – Guy XVI, Count of Laval (d. 1531)
 October 26 – Yi Gi, Korean philosopher (d. 1552)
 November 23 – Yeonsangun of Joseon, King of Korean Joseon Dynasty (d. 1506)
 December 13 – Lucy Brocadelli, Dominican tertiary and stigmatic (d. 1544)
 date unknown – Juan Sebastián Elcano, Spanish explorer (d. 1526)

Deaths 
 January 14 
 John de Mowbray, 4th Duke of Norfolk (b. 1444)
 Anne of York, Duchess of Exeter, Duchess of York, second child of Richard Plantagenet (b. 1439)
 March 1 – Imagawa Yoshitada, 9th head of the Imagawa clan (b. 1436)
 March 10 – Richard West, 7th Baron De La Warr (b. 1430)
 March – John I Ernuszt, Ban of Slavonia
 June 8 – George Neville, English archbishop and statesman (b. c. 1432)
 July 6 – Regiomontanus, German astronomer (b. 1436)
 September 8 – Jean II, Duke of Alençon, son of John I of Alençon and Marie of Brittany (b. 1409)
 November 28 – James of the Marches, Franciscan friar
 December
 Vlad III the Impaler, Prince of Wallachia (b. 1431)
 Isabel Neville, Duchess of Clarence, English noblewoman (b. 1451)
 December 12 – Frederick I, Elector Palatine (b. 1425)
 December 26 – Galeazzo Maria Sforza, Duke of Milan (assassinated) (b. 1444)
 Clara Hätzlerin, German scribe (b. 1430)

References